The 2002 Melbourne Cup was the 142nd running of the Melbourne Cup, a prestigious Australian Thoroughbred horse race.

It was won by Media Puzzle, trained by Dermot Weld and ridden by Damien Oliver. A week before the race Damien's older brother Jason, who was also a jockey was killed from severe head injuries suffered after a fall during a trail the day before at Belmont Park Racecourse in Perth.

Field

This is a list of horses which ran in the 2002 Melbourne Cup.

References

Notes

Bibliography

2002
Melbourne Cup
Melbourne Cup
2000s in Melbourne
November 2002 sports events in Australia